Cross-country skiing at the 2019 Winter Universiade was held at the Raduga Cluster of the Winter Sports Academy in Krasnoyarsk from 3 to 12 March 2019.

Men's events

Women's events

Mixed events

Medal table

References

External links
Results
Results Book – Cross-country Skiing

 
Cross-country skiing
2019
Winter Universiade